Julian Schuster (born 15 April 1985) is a German former professional footballer who played as a midfielder.

Career
Schuster was born in Bietigheim-Bissingen, Baden-Württemberg. He had his professional debut on 27 October 2007 for VfB Stuttgart against Bayer Leverkusen.

In July 2008 he moved to SC Freiburg. On 18 February 2014, Schuster extended his contract for an undisclosed length. In May 2018, he announced his retirement.

Career statistics

References

External links
 

1985 births
Living people
People from Bietigheim-Bissingen
Sportspeople from Stuttgart (region)
German footballers
Footballers from Baden-Württemberg
Association football midfielders
Bundesliga players
2. Bundesliga players
VfB Stuttgart players
VfB Stuttgart II players
SC Freiburg players
SC Freiburg II players